Far Beyond Driven is the seventh studio album by American heavy metal band Pantera, released on March 22, 1994, by East West Records. Pantera's fastest-selling album, it peaked at number 1 on the Billboard 200 and was certified Platinum by the RIAA. The album was also certified Platinum by the Canadian Recording Industry Association. Far Beyond Driven is the first album by Pantera where the band's guitarist Darrell Abbott is credited as "Dimebag Darrell", having changed his nickname from "Diamond Darrell" soon after Vulgar Display of Power was released. The Japanese and the Driven Downunder Tour '94 Souvenir Collection editions contain a bonus thirteenth track, "The Badge", a Poison Idea cover. This cover was also featured on The Crow soundtrack.

Artwork

The original album cover shows a drill going into someone's anus, but the record label rejected it, worrying it would harm sales and would be rejected by stores like Walmart and Target. The band then changed it to a drill put in the frontal lobe of a human skull.

Background, music and lyrics

At the time of its release, Pantera's vocalist Phil Anselmo was injured with ruptured discs in his back and was suffering from chronic pain from degenerative disc disease. Anselmo began drinking heavily, abusing painkillers and muscle relaxants, and using heroin to alleviate the pain.

In an interview at Loyola University in March 2009, Anselmo said:

The song "I'm Broken" is about back pain that Phil Anselmo felt. Anselmo said "This is right when I started feeling the pain in my lower back, and it felt scary," says Anselmo. "I think this is one of the first times in my life, man, that I had this thing called 'vulnerability' kick in, and that was a very uncomfortable feeling." Anselmo adds, "I think that was really my first glimpse into kind of screaming to the world, 'Fucking... I am broken! Somebody fucking help me here!'"

Speaking about the song "5 Minutes Alone", drummer Vinnie Paul said:

Anselmo spoke about what the song "5 Minutes Alone" is about saying:

In the liner notes of the album, all the songs' lyrics are printed apart from the cover of "Planet Caravan". The liner note reads:

The band tuned lower on the album than on previous efforts, with many songs going as low as C# standard. Several lyrical topics appear on Far Beyond Driven. The track "Good Friends and a Bottle of Pills" seems to be a reference to the song "Good Friends and a Bottle of Wine" on the Ted Nugent album Weekend Warriors. Phil Anselmo spoke about the track "Good Friends and a Bottle of Pills" saying:

Pantera's bassist Rex Brown spoke about "Good Friends and a Bottle of Pills" saying:

Phil Anselmo talked about the song "Strength Beyond Strength" saying "I was a rambunctious child," begins Anselmo. "None of it is regrettable, lyrically. You can look back at your lyrics and snicker. I'll always do, whether I'm embarrassed over it, or whether I'm embarrassed over it, or whether I'm embarrassed over it. You can tell growing spurts and pains and where you were in life, so I don't know. Strength fucking Beyond Strength is the old puffin' the chest up, 'look at us now,' we're as cute as [we're] fucking extreme."

Anselmo explained the meaning behind the song "Becoming" saying "The most popular heavy metal bands in the world at that time were, in my estimate and definitely all of our estimates, playing the game," Anselmo says. "They had reached this pinnacle; now they were kind of tapering off and writing more commercial stuff, whereas we realized our strong point, once again, was sticking to heavy metal and making it as heavy as our style would allow. Therefore, with 'Becoming,' it is what it says. We were becoming. Honestly, we had arrived."

Anselmo talks about the meaning behind the song "Shedding Skin" saying, "'Shedding Skin' was about me being in my 20s and any girlfriend, lady-friend of mine trying to tie me down at that age, at that particular time," begins Anselmo. "Basically, 'lay off, right now.' A relationship with me? A serious relationship with me at that age? Forget it, fuck off. Really, it's impossible."

Anselmo talked about the song "Slaughtered" saying "I've always had a distorted view of organized religion and I was never more confused than when I was in my 20s and whatnot," Anselmo says about 'Slaughtered.' "And still I like to use a fusion, if you will, of religions and fuck with them, so to speak. And then tear them down and piss all over them or build them up only to tip over."

Anselmo spoke about the song "Use My Third Arm" saying "A song like 'Use My Third Arm'... sometimes I just go off on just, tangents," Anselmo explains. "It's almost like a formulated temper tantrum over aimless things. Try and find the dead target on that song and I'll shake your hand, because I really don't know. It might take a psychologist or something. It's a temper tantrum, really, put to music."

Anselmo spoke about the song "Hard Lines, Sunken Cheeks" saying "I think it was a foreshadowing of the fear that I felt of not being the same. ... I know for a fact, I guess, that I dabbled in pain pills and stuff like that because I was miserable, and that's always a friggin' dead end, dead road, a terrible path to take. But at the time, I didn't have any other answers."

The song "25 Years", one of Pantera's most personal songs, is about Phil Anselmo's father. Anselmo said, "'25 Years' was written about my father. At the time [I] had a gigantic falling-out with him and I resented the fuck out of him and wrote a beautiful song about it." Anselmo continues, "It was a time capsule of how far he and I had not come, and I think a lot of fans could relate with the dysfunctional family vibe. I think I put in some pretty clever wording here and there, and it might be that wording that they had been searching for themselves for quite a while when it comes to anger."

Release and reception
At midnight on March 22, 1994, Pantera launched the release of Far Beyond Driven with an extensive record store campaign. They traveled to 12 cities in almost five days with MTV documenting their progress. Band members signed autographs, met fans, and promoted the album. The band released "I'm Broken" as the album's first single, which reached #19 on the UK Singles Chart, making it the band's highest charting single worldwide. The LP also contained the first cover song on one of their major-label releases—Black Sabbath's "Planet Caravan" which served as the album's closing track and reached #21 on Billboards Mainstream Rock Tracks and #26 on the UK Singles Chart. By March, the LP had sold over 185,000 copies and had reached #1 on the U.S Billboard 200 album charts and Australian charts upon release. It remained on the Billboard 200 for 29 weeks.

The album received positive reviews. Rolling Stone gave the album four out of five stars. Rolling Stone would eventually rank Far Beyond Driven #39 on their list "The 100 Greatest Metal Albums of All Time". However, AllMusic reviewer Eduardo Rivadavia stated "Far Beyond Driven may have been Pantera's fastest selling album upon release, but it's hardly their best. In fact, although it shot straight to the number one spot on the Billboard sales chart in its first week (arguably the most extreme album ever to do so), this incredible feat doesn't so much reflect its own qualities as those of its predecessor, 1992's Vulgar Display of Power."

In November 2011, Far Beyond Driven was ranked number six on Guitar World magazine's top ten list of guitar albums of 1994. The album was also ranked at number twenty in Guitar Worlds "Superunknown: 50 Iconic Albums That Defined 1994" list.

Reissue
On March 24, 2014, a two-disc deluxe edition of Far Beyond Driven was released to celebrate its 20th anniversary. Disc one is a remastered version of the original album. Disc two is a live album featuring Pantera's set at the 1994 Monsters of Rock Festival.

Tour
Pantera toured South America, and were accepted into another "Monsters of Rock" billing. At that festival on June 4, 1994, the Abbott brothers got into a scuffle with journalists from the music magazine Kerrang! over unflattering cartoon depictions of drummer Vinnie Paul. Then in late June, Anselmo was charged with assault for hitting a security guard after he prevented fans from getting on stage, Anselmo was released on $5,000 bail the next day. The trial was delayed three times. In May 1995, he apologized in court and pleaded guilty to attempted assault and was sentenced to 100 hours of community service. Pantera continued their tour of the United Kingdom in 1994 and eventually ended it in the United States where the band was opened for by fellow heavy metal bands Sepultura and Prong. The tour of Far Beyond Driven also took Pantera to Australia and New Zealand for the first time in November–December 1994.

Track listing

Personnel
Pantera
Phil Anselmo – vocals
Dimebag Darrell – guitars
Rex Brown – bass
Vinnie Paul – drums

Production
Terry Date – producing, engineering and mixing
Pantera – co-producing and arranging
Ted Jensen – mastering

Charts

Weekly charts

Year-end charts

Singles

Certifications

References

1994 albums
Albums produced by Terry Date
East West Records albums
Pantera albums